The 2008 American Handball Men's Youth Championships took place in Blumenau from September 2 – 6. It acts as the Pan American qualifying tournament for the 2009 Men's Youth World Handball Championship.

Teams

Preliminary round

Group A

Group B

Placement 5th–7th

Final round

Semifinals

Bronze medal match

Gold medal match

Final standing

2008 in handball
Pan American Men's Youth Handball Championship
2008 in Venezuelan sport
September 2008 sports events in South America